The Barber Neighborhood is a working class residential neighborhood in Chico, California, generally south of Little Chico Creek and west of Park avenue. The Barber Neighborhood Association represents the interests of the neighborhood to the community. This neighborhood was originally the settlement of Barber, California built to house the employees of the adjacent Diamond Match Factory. The neighborhood was named after Ohio Columbus Barber, president of the Diamond Match Company. The neighborhood lies at an elevation of 190 feet (58 m).  Today, the area is entirely within the city limits of Chico, and the Diamond Match property is designated for a future development called Barber Yard. Some of the notable and historic structures in the neighborhood are:

Arthur Lammers House
Clough Home
E.D. Sharp Home
Fatima Club
J.E. Hibbert House
Perley Home
Redeemer Lutheran Church

See also 
 South Campus Neighborhood
 Chapmantown

References

Neighborhoods in Chico, California